Benzo[ghi]perylene is a polycyclic aromatic hydrocarbon with the chemical formula C22H12.

Occurrence and safety 
Benzo[ghi]perylene occurs naturally in crude oil and coal tar. It is a product of incomplete combustion and is found in tobacco smoke, automobile exhausts, industrial emissions, grilled meat products and edible oils. In the atmosphere, it is adsorbed to particles and is deposited into the soil and water.

The compound accumulates strongly in organisms and the environment, and is suspected to be mutagenic and carcinogenic. It is one of 16 PAHs included in the EPA list of priority pollutants.

References

Polycyclic aromatic hydrocarbons
PBT substances